Koolwijk may refer to:

 Koolwijk, North Brabant, a village in the Netherlands; see Ravenstein, Netherlands
 Koolwijk, South Holland, a village in the Netherlands
 Ryan Koolwijk (born 1985), Dutch footballer

See also
 Kooiwijk, a hamlet in Molenlanden, South Holland, Netherlands
 Kootwijk, Barneveld, Gelderland, Netherlands